The 2022 Tamil Nadu Premier League, also known as (TNPL-6) or, for sponsorship reasons, Shriram Capital TNPL was the sixth season of the Tamil Nadu Premier League (TNPL). It was taking place from 23 June to 31 July 2022.

Chepauk Super Gillies were the defending champions, having won their third title during the previous season. The final match between Chepauk Super Gillies and Lyca Kovai Kings was washed out due to rain and ended in a no result, and both teams were declared co-champions.

Teams

There are eight franchises competing in league. The franchises are named after a district it is representing in the state.

Venue
A total of four venues were used in the 2022 season. The tournament started at Tirunelveli and final was held at SNR College Cricket Ground, Coimbatore.
 Indian Cement Company Ground, Tirunelveli
 NPR College Ground, Dindigul
 SNR College Cricket Ground, Coimbatore
 Salem Cricket Foundation Stadium, Salem

Squads

Standings

Points table

  Advanced to the qualifiers
  Advanced  to the eliminator
  Eliminated from Tournament

League stage

Source:

Matches

Playoffs

Preliminary

Eliminator

Qualifier 1

Qualifier 2

Final

References

External links 
 Series home at ''ESPNcricinfo

Competitions
2022 in Indian cricket
Tamil Nadu Premier League